Irmtraud Morgner, (22 August 19336 May 1990), was a German writer, best known for works of magical realism concerned predominantly with the role of gender in East German society.

Life
Irmtraud Morgner was born in 1933 in Chemnitz, the daughter of a railroad engineer. She took her Abitur in 1952, before studying Germanistik (German studies) and Literary studies at Leipzig until 1956. She worked for the magazine neue deutsche literatur (New German Literature, a journal noted for a degree of confrontation with East German cultural policy) until 1958, after which she lived as a freelance author.

Morgner's first marriage was to Joachim Schreck, later an editor at the publishers Aufbau-Verlag. She gave birth to a son in 1967. Morgner and Schreck divorced in 1970. She married again in 1972, to Paul Wiens, a fellow poet and author. Wiens, like many thousands in East German, was an 'unofficial employee' of the Stasi and informed on Morgner throughout their marriage. They divorced in 1977.

She contributed the piece "Witch Vilmma's invention of speech-swallowing" to the 1984 anthology Sisterhood Is Global: The International Women's Movement Anthology, edited by Robin Morgan.
	
Morgner was diagnosed with cancer in 1987. She received several operations during the late 1980s, but died in May 1990.

Work

After producing a number of relatively conventional socialist realist works, she gained a greater degree of notability and success in 1968 with the novel Hochzeit in Konstantinopel (Wedding in Constantinople). This work, a blend of realism and fantasy exploring feminist themes, was a fresh development in East German literature. While her work as a whole is generally argued to be predominantly concerned with gender, Morgner also touches upon other issues in East German society. She clearly satirises the stultifying effect of censorship on literature under the regime, censorship that she herself often fell foul of. Whilst winning notable awards in East Germany, she was nevertheless subject to surveillance herself, and her works to heavy editing and often rejection.

Her magnum opus may be considered Leben und Abenteuer der Trobadora Beatriz nach Zeugnissen ihrer Spielfrau Laura (The Life and Adventures of Trobadora Beatrice as Chronicled by Her Minstrel Laura). A 'novel in thirteen books and seven intermezzos', it may be considered an epistolary novel as it includes (other than straight narrative) love poetry, morse code, exchanges of correspondence and transcripts. The 'intermezzos' were created from Rumba auf einen Herbst (Rumba for Autumn), a novel previously rejected by the censors in 1965. Together with its sequel Amanda. Ein Hexenroman (Amanda. A Witch's Tale), Leben und Abenteuer der Trobadora Beatriz… was to form a trilogy centred on 'Laura (Amanda) Salman', .

In her final years, cancer somewhat impaired her productivity, and she never completed the 'Salman trilogy'. Fragments of the third novel were later published posthumously as Das heroische Testament (The Heroic Testament).

Works
 Das Signal steht auf Fahrt. Berlin, 1959
 Ein Haus am Rand der Stadt. Berlin, 1962
 Hochzeit in Konstantinopel. Berlin, 1968
 Gauklerlegende. Berlin, 1970
 Die wundersamen Reisen Gustavs des Weltfahrers. Berlin, 1972
 Leben und Abenteuer der Trobadora Beatriz nach Zeugnissen ihrer Spielfrau Laura. Berlin, 1974
 The Life and Adventures of Trobadora Beatrice as Chronicled by Her Minstrel Laura (translated by Jeanette Clausen). Nebraska, 2000
 Geschlechtertausch (with Sarah Kirsch und Christa Wolf). Darmstadt, 1980
 Amanda. Ein Hexenroman (Amanda. A Witch's Tale). Berlin, 1983
 Die Hexe im Landhaus (with Erica Pedretti). Zürich, 1984
 Der Schöne und das Biest. Leipzig, 1991
 Rumba auf einen Herbst. Hamburg, 1992
 Das heroische Testament (The Heroic Testament). München, 1998
 Erzählungen. Berlin, 2006

References

External links
Geoff Westgate introduces Irmtraud Morgner (New Books in German)
Socialist Magical Realism (Complete Review)

1933 births
1990 deaths
People from Chemnitz
Writers from Saxony
East German writers
East German women
Feminist writers
German socialist feminists
Socialist realism writers
German Protestants
Marxist feminists
German communists
Magic realism writers
20th-century German women writers
Communist women writers
Heinrich Mann Prize winners